William Wescombe Corpe (29 April 1836 – 26 March 1923) was a New Zealand clerk, station manager, sawmiller, storekeeper and in particular,  dairy manufacturer. He was born in Stoke St Gregory, Somerset, England on 29 April 1836.

References

1836 births
1923 deaths
English emigrants to New Zealand
New Zealand traders
New Zealand sawmillers